The following is a list of libraries in Nigeria.

Listing

See also
 List of universities in Nigeria
 List of polytechnics in Nigeria

References

Further reading

Published in the 20th century
 
 
 
 

Published in the 21st century

 

 

 
Aina, A. J.; Ogungbeni, J. I.; Adigun, J. A.; and Ogundipe, T. C., "Poor Reading Habits Among Nigerians: The Role of Libraries" (2011). Library Philosophy and Practice (e-journal). 529. https://digitalcommons.unl.edu/libphilprac/529

External links

 Nigerian Library Association

 01
Libraries
Nigeria
Libraries